Fattahabad or Fatahabad may refer to:

Fattahabad, Kurdistan
Fattahabad, Lorestan